Douglas Township is one of fifteen townships in Effingham County, Illinois, USA.  As of the 2010 census, its population was 12,604 and it contained 5,740 housing units.

Geography

Cities, towns, villages
 Effingham (vast majority)

Extinct towns
 Green Creek

Cemeteries
The township contains these five cemeteries: Effingham City, Green Creek, Ramsey, Saint Anthony Catholic and Saint John Lutheran.

Major highways
  Interstate 57
  U.S. Route 40
  U.S. Route 45
  Illinois Route 32
  Illinois Route 33

Airports and landing strips
 Saint Anthony Memorial Hospital Heliport

Landmarks
 Oak Ridge Cemetery

Demographics

School districts
 Beecher City Community Unit School District 20
 Effingham Community Unit School District 40
 Stewardson-Strasburg Community Unit District 5a
 Teutopolis Community Unit School District 50

Political districts
 Illinois' 19th congressional district
 State House District 102
 State House District 108
 State Senate District 51
 State Senate District 54

References
 
 United States Census Bureau 2007 TIGER/Line Shapefiles
 United States National Atlas

External links
 City-Data.com
 Illinois State Archives

Townships in Effingham County, Illinois
1860 establishments in Illinois
Populated places established in 1860
Townships in Illinois